"Minimal" is a song by English synth-pop duo Pet Shop Boys from their ninth studio album, Fundamental (2006). It was released on 24 July 2006 as the album's second single, reaching at number 19 on the UK Singles Chart and becoming the duo's 37th top-20 entry in the United Kingdom. The B-side "In Private" (Stuart Crichton 7″ Mix) is a new version of a song originally written for Dusty Springfield, this time recorded as a duet between Neil Tennant and Elton John.

Background
The lyrics, built around a chant of "M-I-N-I-M-A-L", are an abstract description of expressions of minimalism, such as "more is less" and "an empty box, an open space". This is contradicted by the upbeat, busy instrumentation and production.

Originally planned as the first single from Fundamental, it was subsequently moved down the release schedule when "I'm with Stupid" was chosen instead.

Music video
The music video for "Minimal" was directed by Dan Cameron and filmed in Paris. It features a pair of dancers (Keir and Thailai Knight) manoeuvering to form the letters of the chorus, while Tennant and Lowe perform in front of a light display.

Track listings
UK CD single (CDR 6708)
"Minimal" (radio edit) – 3:38
"In Private" (7-inch mix) – 4:13

UK CD maxi single (CDRS 6708)
"Minimal" (radio edit) – 3:38
"Minimal" (Tocadisco's Sunday at Space Remix) – 8:00
"Minimal" (M Factor Remix) – 8:45
"Minimal" (U-MYX software)

UK DVD single (DVDR 6708)
"Minimal" (Telex Hell mix) – 6:18
"Blue on Blue" – 3:13
"No Time for Tears" (7-inch mix) – 3:38
"Minimal" (music video)

UK 7-inch single (R 6708)'
A. "Minimal" (radio edit) – 3:38
B. "In Private" (7-inch mix) – 4:13

UK promotional CD maxi single (00946 371144 2 1)
"Minimal" (radio edit) – 3:40
"Minimal" (Tocadisco's Sunday at Space Mix) – 8:04
"Minimal" (M Factor mix) – 8:49
"Minimal" (M Factor dub) – 7:44
"Minimal" (Tiga's M-I-N-I-M-A-L remix) – 5:38
"Minimal" (Tiga's M-I-N-I-M-A-L dub) – 5:38
"Minimal" (Superchumbo's Light & Shade dub) – 8:28
"Minimal" (Telex Hell remix) – 6:19
"Minimal" (Telex Heaven remix) – 4:29
"In Private" (Tomcraft 7-inch mix) – 3:51

Another remix of "Minimal" by Lobe appears on the limited edition bonus CD of Fundamental, Fundamentalism. The Tiga remix was included on the Japanese release.

Another remix of "Minimal" by Radio Slave appears on the B-side of a promotional 12-inch with two remixes of "Psychological" on the A-side by Ewan Pearson. These are part of the "Numb" promotion.

In addition, it was the first Pet Shop Boys single release to feature the U-MYX software on the maxi-CD which allows people to create their own version of the single. On 25 July, Chris Lowe himself created a new version of the track using the software and uploaded it onto the U-MYX website.

Charts

References

External links
 PSB U-Myx microsite

2006 singles
2006 songs
Parlophone singles
Pet Shop Boys songs
Song recordings produced by Trevor Horn
Songs written by Chris Lowe
Songs written by Neil Tennant